John Alexander Smith may refer to:

John Alexander Smith (1863–1939), British idealist philosopher
John Alexander Smith (curator) (c.1814–1889), British-New Zealand businessman, museum curator and councillor
John Alexander Smith (physician) (1818–1883), Scottish physician, antiquarian, archaeologist and ornithologist.